Velislav Ivanov Vutsov (Bulgarian: Велислав Иванов Вуцов) (born 19 July 1967) is a Bulgarian football manager and former footballer. He is also the son of former footballer Ivan Vutsov.

Career
Throughout his career, he has been the manager of the following football teams: Spartak Pleven, Spartak Varna, Yantra Gabrovo, Cherno More Varna, Marek Dupnitsa, Kaliakra Kavarna and Levski Sofia.
On 8 May 2008 he was assigned as the new manager of PFC Levski Sofia, seeing his "dream posting" occur, only to be fired after 2 official matches on 13 August 2008, after Levski Sofia's 0–1 home loss in Champions League qualifying to BATE Borisov.

On 8 March 2009, he began work as a sports commentator on the "Sports Mania" show alongside Krum Savov.

In late November 2012, he was appointed as the head coach of Slavia Sofia, replacing Martin Kushev. Vutsov was dismissed in June 2013.

Personal life
He and his wife Svetlana have three sons - Ivan, Petar, and Svetoslav, with the latter two also playing professional football. Vutsov is a graduate of the National Sports Academy and has a degree in sports journalism.

Manager

, includes all official matches – Bulgarian League, Bulgarian Cup (+ overtime) and international tournament games.

References

External links 
 Profile at LevskiSofia.info

Living people
Bulgarian footballers
PFC Levski Sofia players
PFC Spartak Varna players
PFC Slavia Sofia players
FC Yantra Gabrovo players
PFC Minyor Pernik players
PFC Lokomotiv Plovdiv players
Akademik Sofia players
SKN St. Pölten players
PFC Cherno More Varna players
First Professional Football League (Bulgaria) players
Association football midfielders
Bulgarian football managers
PFC Spartak Varna managers
PFC Cherno More Varna managers
PFC Levski Sofia managers
PFC Slavia Sofia managers
1967 births
Botev Plovdiv managers
Footballers from Sofia
FC Yantra Gabrovo managers
People from Gabrovo